Monkgomery is a children's puppet. It takes the form of a talking monkey wearing a necktie, released by Hasbro in 1986. The toy is 17" in height and sits at approximately 14" tall. The toy has two Velcro strips on his hands allowing him to be hung from objects. The toy can also function as a cuddle buddy at night and a day time play toy. Additional speech modules provided 200 new words (each came with a different outfit).

It was created by Hasbro to compete with Teddy Ruxpin before Hasbro bought Ruxpin, and Monkgomery's packaging draws deliberate comparison, describing him as "a unique and interactive, joke-telling, talking monkey with no on-off switches, no tapes to wear out or break and no solid state cartridges".

Monkgomery's vocabulary included jokes such as "Why did the monkey throw the clock out the window?", questions such as "What's your favorite part of the zoo?" and responses to the user, such as "Tell me more!". The range of phrases could be expanded with expansion modules, sold separately.

History
Bingo Bear and Monkgomery Monkey were part of a Hasbro Softies product line called "Yakity Yaks". Their debut in 1986 was not as strong as that of Teddy Ruxpin, but toy sellers pointed to them as a less expensive alternative for parents who could not afford Teddy Ruxpin.

Design 
The toy has a removable yellow tie with red polka dots, and is monogrammed with "Monkgomery".

The puppets were more durable than other toys, since they did not contain gears or movable parts. The absence of mechanical parts made the puppets more cuddly for children.  Its design makes it to versatile, safe and durable, compared to mechanical toys. Dr. Bingo and Space Bingo outfits for Bingo Bear were scheduled for release at the end of December 1986; a Safari Monkgomery kit for Monkgomery Monkey was scheduled to be released in January 1987. The Hasbro dealer catalog shows a Monkgomery Monkey Clown Outfit and Rock Star Bingo Bear Outfit (unknown if released). The toys sold for about $70 and the extra word module kits for $20.

Mechanics and parts
Monkgomery has a rear opening that allows manipulation of mouth movements by hand. This opening also gave access to a pressure-sensitive switch on the top of the mouth and a solid mass at the bottom to engage the switch mechanism. Engagement triggers the electronic speech integrated circuit TMS5110ANL. Speech consisted of a set of 400 pre-recorded words (100 phrases), in voiceover format (performed by Bill Cochran), stored in Texas Instrument CM62060N2L, CM62059N2L, E7CL04N2L ICs. The words played out on an 8 Ω, 0.25 watt F.S.T F05702 mono speaker. The board contained a never-used nine pin edge connector for expansion modules. These parts were built into a brown plastic box with a 4-AA battery holder. The brown box was zipped inside the back of the monkey's back with two snaps for fastening inside and a removable eight pin connector cable for interactions with mouth switch, "tickle" sensors, right ear and right foot.

Hasbro Dealer Catalog

See also
Speech IC

References

External links
Voice Over artist site with MP3 of speech from Monkgomery
ADVERTISING; Yakity Yak Animals Coming From Hasbro
Bingo Bear commercial
Hasbro Toy Catalog with the Yakity Yaks PG.73 (75)
Children play with high-tech toys that talk
Canada trade-mark data
USA trade-mark data

Stuffed toys
Toy brands
1980s toys
1990s toys
Hasbro products